The 1992 United States presidential election in Nebraska took place on November 3, 1992, as part of the 1992 United States presidential election. Voters chose five representatives, or electors to the Electoral College, who voted for president and vice president.

Nebraska was won by incumbent President George H. W. Bush (R-Texas) with 46.58% of the popular vote over Governor Bill Clinton (D-Arkansas) with 29.40%. Businessman Ross Perot (I-Texas) finished in third, with 23.63% of the popular vote. Clinton ultimately won the national election, defeating Bush and Perot in by a large margin in the popular vote and electoral college.

With 46.58% of the popular vote, Nebraska would give Bush his fourth-highest vote percentage in the nation after Mississippi, South Carolina and Alabama. In margin of victory, however, it was Bush's best state, as he defeated Clinton by a 17.18-point margin.

Perot came within 5.8% of Clinton's vote share in the state, and exceeded his share in 70 of Nebraska's 93 counties, as well as in the state's heavily conservative 3rd congressional district.

This was the first election in which Nebraska allocated its electoral votes, awarding 2 EV's to the overall winner of the state and 1 EV to the winner of each congressional district. As Bush won all three districts as well as the state's popular vote, he was awarded all 5 electoral votes. It would not be until 2008 that there would be a split in the state's electoral votes, with Barack Obama winning one electoral vote from the 2nd district and John McCain winning the rest.

While Bush came in a strong first, the race for second place between Perot and Clinton was much more competitive. In the rural areas of the state, Perot generally ran ahead of Clinton, placing second behind Bush in 68 of Nebraska's 93 counties. In some counties in the western part of the state, Clinton was reduced to third party status, such as in Arthur county, where he polled a measly 7% of the vote to Perot's 37% and Bush's 56%. However, Clinton was able to counter this and poll second statewide by running a strong second in most of the eastern part of the state, including, critically, heavily populated Douglas and Lancaster counties. In these two counties alone, he received 108,499 votes, almost exactly half of his statewide total. Without these two counties, Perot would have beat Clinton for second with 114,039 votes to Clinton's 108,845 (Bush would still be far ahead with 209,244).

Results

Results by county

See also
 United States presidential elections in Nebraska
 Presidency of Bill Clinton

Notes

References

Nebraska
1992
1992 Nebraska elections